We Are The Youth is a project attempting to capture stories of LGBT youth in America through photography. This project was started by Diana Scholl and Laurel Golio in 2010, when they photographed a PFLAG Gay Prom. Photos from We Are The Youth are available as an online archive of LGBT youth on their website as well as in book form in We Are the Youth: Sharing the Stories of LGBTQ Youth in the United States, which received a top ten spot on the American Library Association's Rainbow List in 2015. Work from the project has also been displayed at the Silver Eye Center for Photography in Pittsburgh in 2014  and at the Leslie-Lohman Museum of Art in New York in 2012.

People photographed as part of the project range in age from 12 to 21.

References

External links 
 

LGBT arts organizations
Photojournalism
LGBT youth organizations based in the United States
2010 establishments in the United States